Tracy Barnes (born April 26, 1982) is an American biathlete. She competed in three events at the 2006 Winter Olympics.

References

External links
 

1982 births
Living people
Biathletes at the 2006 Winter Olympics
American female biathletes
Olympic biathletes of the United States
People from Durango, Colorado
21st-century American women